Lifa or LIFA may refer to:
 Leeward Islands Football Association, an association of the football playing nations in Leeward archipelago
 Lifa, an album by the folk music band Heilung
 Long Island Forensic Association, a non-profit organization which direct high school competitive speech events
 Djamel Lifa (born 1969), French boxer